Mercedes of Spain may refer to:

 Mercedes of Orléans, queen consort of Spain
 Mercedes, Princess of Asturias, heiress-presumptive of Spain
Princess Maria Mercedes of Bourbon-Two Sicilies, Countess of Barcelona, mother of King Juan Carlos